is a Japanese footballer currently playing as a forward or a winger for Thespakusatsu Gunma on loan from Shimizu S-Pulse.

Career statistics

Club

Notes

References

External links

2001 births
Living people
Japanese footballers
Japan youth international footballers
Association football forwards
J1 League players
Shimizu S-Pulse players
Fagiano Okayama players